Iodotropheus declivitas is a species of cichlid endemic to Lake Malawi.  This species can reach a length of  SL. This taxon is regarded as a junior synonym of Iodotropheus sprengerae by some authorities.

References

Fish of Malawi
declivitas
Taxa named by Jay Richard Stauffer Jr.
Taxonomy articles created by Polbot
Fish described in 1994
Taxobox binomials not recognized by IUCN
Fish of Lake Malawi